The 1987 Campeonato Ecuatoriano de Fútbol de la Serie A was the 29th national championship for football teams in Ecuador.

Teams
The number of teams for this season was played by 18 teams.

First stage

Second stage

Group A

Group B

Cuadrangular Final

References

External links
 Artículo Oficial de Barcelona Campeón Nacional 1987 en la página web del Diario El Universo
 Línea de Tiempo de eventos y partidos de Liga Deportiva Universitaria
 Calendario de partidos históricos de Liga Deportiva Universitaria
 Sistema de Consulta Interactiva y Herramienta de consulta interactiva de partidos de Liga Deportiva Universitaria

1987
Ecu